Quique Dacosta is a Spanish chef. He began his professional career as a chef in 1986. In 1988, he began working at the restaurant that became Quique Dacosta Restaurante. 

Dacosta has been awarded the Gold Medal for Merit in the Fine Arts and has been also appointed Best Spanish Restaurateur by the Royal Gastronomic Academy, has turned the Quique Dacosta Restaurant into an internationally renowned mecca for haute cuisine. His cuisine is inspired by the food and geographies of the Mediterranean Sea and the Montgó Natural Park. 

Today, he is known around the world for his artistic culinary expression. He has become a chef who uses his culture and territory like a banner, personifying quality, excellence, innovation and tradition. 

He is the director and culinary creator of the Hotel Mandarin Oriental Ritz in Madrid. Deessa, one of his restaurants within the hotel, received its first Michelin star just seven months after its opening.

Dacosta has created ArrosQD, a restaurant based in London. Other restaurants that he has created or owns include ArrosQD, El Poblet, Llisa negra, Vuelve Carolina and Mercatbar. Dacosta has also published De Tapas con Quique Dacosta ("Tapas with Quique Dacosta"), a recipe book compiling 80 of his restaurants' recipes.

Restaurants 
Chef and Owner of:
 "Quique Dacosta Restaurant" in Denia (3* Michelin Stars and 3 Repsol Suns)
 "El Poblet" (2* Michelin Stars and 2 Repsol Suns)
 Deessa (2* Michelin star). Mandarin Oriental Ritz, Madrid 
 "Vuelve Carolina" (1 Repsol Sun)
 "Mercat Bar" in Valencia
"Llisa Negra" in Valencia
"Arrosqd" in London
Palm Court. Mandarin Oriental Ritz, Madrid 
El Jardín del Ritz. Mandarin Oriental Ritz, Madrid 
Champagne Bar. Mandarin Oriental Ritz, Madrid 
Pictura. Mandarin Oriental Ritz, Madrid 
"Quique Dacosta Delivery" in Spain, distribute foods

Awards
 Gold Medal for Merit in the Fine Arts 2020
 Best Spanish Restaurateur by the Royal Gastronomic Academy, 2019
 Doctor Honoris Causa by the faculty of Fine Arts of the Miguel Hernández University of Elche.
 (Ranks 39) in The World's 50 Best Restaurants, 2015 by prestigious magazine The Restaurant.
 Best Restaurant in Europe according to Opinionated About Dining 2012 and 2013.
 National Prize for Gastronomy, awarded by The Spanish Royal Academy of Gastronomy, 2005 and 2009.
 Millesime Chef Award 2013.
3 Michelin stars since 2012.

See also
Local food

References

External links

Official website
Official website (Spanish)
El Poblet Restaurant
Vuelve Carolina Restaurant (Spanish Language)
GASMA
Llisa Negra Restaurant
Mercat Bar Restaurant

Living people
Head chefs of Michelin starred restaurants
Spanish chefs
1972 births